Catching Up with Depeche Mode is a compilation album by English electronic music band Depeche Mode, released solely in North America on 11 November 1985 by Sire Records.

October 1985 saw the international release of the album The Singles 81→85, which collected the band's seven-inch singles to that date. Sire Records felt a new album would have to differ from this international release since some of the band's singles had already appeared on the compilation People Are People the previous year. Catching Up with Depeche Mode included the band's singles not already available on People Are People—all except "Leave in Silence", "Get the Balance Right!", "Everything Counts", and "People Are People"—as well as two B-sides, "Flexible" and "Fly on the Windscreen".

Catching Up with Depeche Mode peaked at number 113 on the US Billboard Top Pop Albums chart. On 2 August 2000, the album was certified Platinum by the Recording Industry Association of America (RIAA).

Track listing

Personnel
Credits adapted from the liner notes of Catching Up with Depeche Mode.

 Daniel Miller – production 
 Depeche Mode – production 
 Gareth Jones – production 
 Eric Watson – front cover photography
 Martyn Atkins – design, photo treatment
 Mark Higenbottam – design, photo treatment
 David A. Jones – design, photo treatment

Charts

Certifications

References

External links
 Album information from the official Depeche Mode website

1985 compilation albums
Albums produced by Daniel Miller (music producer)
Albums produced by Gareth Jones (music producer)
Depeche Mode compilation albums
Sire Records compilation albums